John Wilfred Findlay (27 November 1891 – 1 June 1951) was a New Zealand cricketer, soldier and businessman.

Family
Wilfred Findlay was the eldest of three sons of John Findlay, a New Zealand KC and politician who became a Cabinet minister and was knighted in 1911. The second son, James Lloyd Findlay, was an officer who served in both world wars, and the third son, Ian Calcutt Findlay, died on active service in the First World War.

Cricket career
Wilfred Findlay attended Wellington College, Wellington, where he played in the cricket team. He showed promise in Wellington senior cricket as a fast bowler of genuine pace. He made his first-class debut shortly after he turned 19, and played four matches for Wellington in two seasons, taking 13 wickets at the low average of 15.30 and at a high strike-rate of a wicket every 33 deliveries.

Later life
However, family and business commitments took Findlay to England in 1912. He enlisted in the British Army shortly after the outbreak of World War I in 1914 and served throughout the war, first with the King's Royal Rifles and then with the Machine Gun Corps, ending with the rank of major.  

On 23 December 1919, in Loughton, Essex, he married Miss Helen Blagden Rich of New York. He was working in insurance in London at the time. He spent most of the rest of his life in Britain and finally the United States, where he was an executive in the insurance industry in New York.

References

External links
 
 Wilfred Findlay at CricketArchive

1891 births
1951 deaths
People educated at Wellington College (New Zealand)
Wellington cricketers
New Zealand cricketers
Cricketers from Wellington City
New Zealand military personnel of World War I
Machine Gun Corps officers
King's Royal Rifle Corps officers
New Zealand businesspeople